Michael Davis (born January 6, 1995) is an American football cornerback for the Los Angeles Chargers of the National Football League (NFL). He played college football at BYU from 2013 to 2016. He signed with the Chargers as an undrafted free agent in 2017

Early years
Davis is of mixed heritage, and was raised Catholic by his single, Mexican mother. Davis participated in both the Glendale High School football and track and field teams all four years. During his senior year, he earned first-team All-CIF, league, & area honors. In track and field, Davis had won the Pacific League title in the 100-meter sprint 3 straight years and the 200-meter sprint 4 straight years. He ran the 100 and 200-meter dash with best times of 10.5 and 21.3. Davis also qualified for the California State Championship Meet for the 200 his junior and senior years. In 2012, he finished seventh overall, and finished fifth overall in 2013.

College career
Davis attended BYU from 2013 to 2016, and totaled 110 tackles and 17 pass break-ups in his four seasons there.  Davis lost his starting position for a time during his senior season, but came off the bench to make the biggest play of his career, an interception and 40-yard return on the road against Michigan State that helped the Cougars secure a 31-14 upset victory.

Professional career

Los Angeles Chargers
Davis was signed by the Los Angeles Chargers as an undrafted free agent on May 1, 2017. He was waived on September 2, 2017 and was signed to the Chargers' practice squad the next day. He was promoted to the active roster on September 16, 2017.

Davis was suspended two games by the NFL for violating the league's substance abuse policy on November 22, 2019. He was reinstated from suspension on December 9, 2019, and activated two days later.

On April 9, 2020, Davis was re-signed to a one-year, $3.259 million contract.

In Week 4 against the Tampa Bay Buccaneers, Davis intercepted a pass thrown by Tom Brady and returned it 78 yards for a touchdown during the 38–31 loss.

On March 15, 2021, Davis signed a multi-year contract extension with the Chargers.

References

External links
BYU Cougars bio
Los Angeles Chargers bio

1995 births
Living people
American football defensive backs
BYU Cougars football players
Los Angeles Chargers players
American sportspeople of Mexican descent
Players of American football from California
Sportspeople from Glendale, California
African-American Catholics